Stagecoach North West was a major operator of bus services in North West England. It was a subsidiary of the Stagecoach Group, and had its origins in the purchase of Cumberland in 1987 and Ribble Motor Services in 1988 from the National Bus Company. The head office of Stagecoach North West was in Carlisle. Although the cities of Liverpool and Manchester are in the North West of England, Stagecoach Manchester and Stagecoach Merseyside were run as separate divisions.

Stagecoach North West was split in September 2011 into Stagecoach Merseyside & South Lancashire and Stagecoach Cumbria & North Lancashire, with the former incorporating Chorley and Preston depots and the Gillmoss depot of Stagecoach Merseyside, and the latter incorporating Barrow, Carlisle, Kendal and Workington depots. After the split, the company, Stagecoach North West Ltd, continues to exist with the trading name Stagecoach Cumbria & North Lancashire.

History
Stagecoach North West operated services in Carlisle, Chorley, Lancaster, Morecambe, Preston, the Lake District with some services running to/from Blackburn, Liverpool, Manchester, Newcastle and Southport. Stagecoach North West consisted of 3 different areas, which were:

Stagecoach in Cumbria
Stagecoach in Lancashire (Chorley and Preston)
Stagecoach in Lancaster

Stagecoach North West also ran several services which are contracted to Cumbria County Council, Lancashire County Council or Transport for Greater Manchester

Stagecoach in Cumbria
Stagecoach in Cumbria is a trading name of Stagecoach North West Ltd and operates services around the Cumbria area (formerly known as Stagecoach Cumberland, Stagecoach Ribble and Barrow Borough Transport).

Cumberland was one of the first National Bus Company subsidiaries to be privatised: this was almost immediately after gaining the Penrith and Carlisle depots from Ribble. The company was bought from the NBC by Stagecoach, who split it into two territories: CMS Carlislebus for services within Carlisle itself and CMS Cumberland for the rest of the services; eventually both territories merged with Ribble's south Cumbria services to become Stagecoach Cumberland.

In 2005 Stagecoach introduced new double-decker buses on its flagship service X35 route between Barrow-in-Furness, Ulverston, Grange-over-Sands and Kendal. This route, now renamed X6, is partly subsidised by Cumbria County Council, ensuring that a return fare between Barrow/Ulverston and Kendal is £6.50, as of April 2014.

The 62, 62A and 62B service to Kingmoor Park are also subsidised by Cumbria County Council, as of 2013.

In January 2008, the flagship 555/6 route from Keswick - Lancaster was upgraded to Dennis Trident/ALX400 operation. A further upgrade was due in October 2011, this time to brand new Scania N230UD/Enviro400s.

Depots
 Barrow (Walney Road)
 Carlisle (Willowholme Road)
 Kendal (Station Road/Beezon Road)
 Workington (Blackwood Road, Lillyhall Trading Estate)

Stagecoach in Lancashire

Stagecoach in Lancashire was the trading name of Ribble Motor Services Ltd and operated services around the Central Lancashire area, serving Preston, Chorley, Bolton and Blackburn (formerly Stagecoach Ribble). The company also operated Network Chorley, which provided transport around the Chorley area.

In 2006 Stagecoach started to increase services in Preston under the name Stagecoach Preston Citi, using mainly Optare Solos and Dennis Enviro 400s, in competition with the established operator, Preston Bus. Stagecoach duplicated some Preston Bus routes, such as 19 and 22 to Royal Preston Hospital, 11 to Gamull Lane and 16 to Farringdon Park, as well as introducing new services such as the 32 to Larches and Savick and services to Tanterton and Ingol. They also increasing the frequency of service 3 to Penwortham, as Preston Bus had started a frequent service between Preston and Penwortham, and a limited service between Preston and Southport, duplicating existing Stagecoach routes. The bus war ended in January 2009, with the purchase of Preston Bus by Stagecoach North West. For more details, see Stagecoach in Preston or the sub category below.

Stagecoach in Lancashire has many smaller labels: The Fylde Villager, The Wyre Villager, Network Ribble Valley & Network Chorley. Other services include X2, 125 and 109.

In early 2009, Stagecoach lost the contract for some Fylde Villager branded services to Cumfybus and Coastal Coaches, who operate them on behalf of Lancashire County Council.

Depots
 Preston (Selbourne Street)

Stagecoach Preston Bus (defunct 2011)

On 23 January 2009 Preston Bus became part of the Stagecoach North West subsidiary, ending over 100 years service of Preston Bus to the city. In March 2009 Preston Bus was rebranded Stagecoach Preston Bus and operated Stagecoach routes within the City of Preston, its suburbs (e.g., South Ribble, Longridge, Chipping) and the surrounding area. Stagecoach Preston Bus operated from the Deepdale Road Depot.

On 19 January 2011 Stagecoach in Preston was sold to Rotala.

Depot
 Preston (Deepdale Road)

Stagecoach in Lancaster

Stagecoach in Lancaster operates services in Lancaster, Morecambe, and the surrounding area, including the services between Morecambe/Lancaster and Preston/Blackpool. It is a trading name of Stagecoach North West Ltd, and consists of the former Stagecoach Ribble services in the area combined with those formerly operated by Lancaster City Transport, the local municipal bus operator which ceased trading in 1993.

They operate mainly from their depot in White Lund, Morecambe. There are also two outstations at Ingleton and Caterall.

Depot
 Lancaster (Whitegate White Lund Industrial Estate, Morecambe)

Controversy
From 2006 to 2009, Preston Bus had been experiencing competition from Stagecoach North West. Competition escalated into a bus war with Stagecoach offering lower fares on the busiest routes. The managing director of Preston Bus was concerned that Stagecoach could force his company out of business. Both companies have accused each other of unprofessional behaviour. However Stagecoach was forced by the authorities to suspend two of its drivers for throwing eggs at Preston buses. But in January 2009, Preston Bus was sold to Stagecoach Northwest, and the combination of Preston Bus and Stagecoach Preston Citi formed Stagecoach in Preston in March 2009.

References

External links
Stagecoach UK Bus
A report on the merger situation between Stagecoach Holdings plc and Lancaster City Transport Limited (Competition Commission)

Stagecoach Group bus operators in England
Employee-owned companies of the United Kingdom
Former bus operators in Cumbria
Former bus operators in Lancashire